Nikolai Alekseevich Pilyugin (Krasnoye Selo - 2 August 1982) was Soviet chief designer of rocket guidance systems.

He was a designer of control systems for boosters and spacecraft.

He participated in design of the first ICBM "R-7" and Soviet space shuttle Buran.

A graduate of the Baumann higher technical school (MVTU), Pilyugin worked at the Zhukovsky Central Institute of Aerohydrodynamics (TsAGI) starting in 1934, then joined RNII the Institute of Jet Propulsion.  In 1945, he joined Boris Chertok at the RABE institute in Germany, studying the design of the V-2 and other Nazi weaponry.

In 1946, he along with Mikhail Ryazansky headed the newly formed NII-885.  Pilyugin developed gyroscopic guidance control systems and flight control computers for Soviet rockets beginning with the R-1 (a copy of the V-2).

Awards
 Twice Hero of Socialist Labor (1956, 1961)
 Lenin Prize (1957)
 USSR State Prize (1967)
 Order of Lenin (1956, 1958, 1968, 1975, 1978)
 Order of the October Revolution (1971)
  Deputy to the Supreme Soviet of the USSR 7th - 10th convocations.

Further reading 
 J. K. Golovanov, M., "Korolev: Facts and myths", Nauka, 1994, ;
 "Rockets and people" – B. E. Chertok, M: "mechanical engineering", 1999.  ;
 "Testing of rocket and space technology - the business of my life" Events and facts - A.I. Ostashev, Korolyov, 2001.;
 "Bank of the Universe" - edited by Boltenko A. C., Kyiv, 2014., publishing house "Phoenix", 
 A.I. Ostashev, Sergey Pavlovich Korolyov - The Genius of the 20th Century — 2010 M. of Public Educational Institution of Higher Professional Training MGUL .
 Nikolay Pilyugin //Family history
 "S. P. Korolev. Encyclopedia of life and creativity" - edited by C. A. Lopota, RSC Energia. S. P. Korolev, 2014 

1908 births
1982 deaths
People from Krasnoye Selo
Full Members of the USSR Academy of Sciences
Heroes of Socialist Labour
Lenin Prize winners
Recipients of the USSR State Prize
Soviet aerospace engineers
Soviet inventors
Soviet space program personnel
Bauman Moscow State Technical University alumni
Central Aerohydrodynamic Institute employees